"Beautiful" is a song by American singer Bazzi, initially self-released digitally on July 2, 2017.  The song was later featured as the 13th track on the album Cosmic, which was released on April 12, 2018. A reimagined version of the song, featuring Cuban-American singer-songwriter Camila Cabello was released on August 2, 2018.

Credits and personnel
Credits adapted from Cosmic album liner notes.

Publishing
 Published by Zipendat Music / Artist 101 Publishing Group (BMI) Admin. by Warner Chappell; MCWII Publishing (ASCAP); The Otis Publishing (SESAC)

Recording
 Engineered in Los Angeles, California
 Mixed at Larrabee Studio, West Hollywood, California
 Mastered at Sterling Sound, New York City, New York

Personnel
 Bazzi – vocals, songwriting, production
 Rice N’ Peas – production, mixing
 Chris Gehringer – production
 Kevin White – record engineering, songwriting
 Michael Woods – songwriting
 Robin Florent – record engineering
 Scott Desmarais – record engineering
 Aubry "Big Juice" Delaine – record engineering
 Chris Galland – mixing engineering

Charts and certifications

Year-end charts

Certifications

Release history

Camila Cabello reimagined version

The duet version featuring Cuban-American singer Camila Cabello was released on August 2, 2018.

Chart performance
The duet version peaked at number 26 on the Billboard Hot 100, 33 in the UK and 35 in Canada. Internationally, the song peaked at number 2 in Malaysia, 3 in Lebanon and Singapore, 4 in Belgium and Romania, and various spots in the Top 20 and Top 40.

Music video
The music video for "Beautiful" featuring Cabello was released on October 15, 2018, directed by Jason Koenig.

Track listing

Credits and personnel
Credits adapted from Tidal.

Personnel
 Bazzi – vocals, songwriting, production
 Camila Cabello – vocals, songwriting
 Rice N’ Peas – production, mixing
 Chris Gehringer – production
 Louis Bell – vocals production (for new verses)
 Kevin White – record engineering
 Robin Florent – record engineering
 Scott Desmarais – record engineering
 Aubry "Big Juice" Delaine – record engineering
 Chris Galland – mixing engineering

Charts

Weekly charts

Year-end charts

Certifications

Release history

References

2017 songs
2017 singles
2018 singles
Bazzi (singer) songs
Camila Cabello songs
Songs written by Bazzi (singer)
Songs written by Camila Cabello
Male–female vocal duets
Pop ballads
Contemporary R&B ballads